Jarno Molenberghs (born 11 December 1989) is a Belgian football player who currently plays for Olympia Wijgmaal.

References
 Guardian Football
 
 Jarno Molenberghs at Footballdatabase

1989 births
Living people
Belgian footballers
K.V.C. Westerlo players
Lommel S.K. players
K. Patro Eisden Maasmechelen players
Belgian Pro League players
Challenger Pro League players
Association football midfielders
Lierse Kempenzonen players
People from Geel
Footballers from Antwerp Province